This list details the lesbian, gay, bisexual, transgender, and queer people who have been nominated for or received Academy Awards and cis-hetero actors who have been nominated for or won for playing queer characters. Individuals are identified as queer though they may not have publicly or personally identified at the time of their nomination.

Best Actor in a Leading Role

Speculated to be LGBTQ
The following list is composed of actors who have been claimed to be LGBT by others. They have been outed by a third party either alive or after their death. However, they never publicly came out.

Performances of LGBTQ Characters Nominated for or Awarded Best Actor in a Leading Role

Best Actress in a Leading Role

Performances of LGBTQ Characters Nominated for or Awarded Best Actress in a Leading Role

Best Actor in a Supporting Role

Speculated to be LGBTQ
The following list is composed of actors who have been claimed to be LGBT by others. They have been outed by a third party either alive or after their death. However, they never publicly came out.

Performances of LGBTQ Characters Nominated for or Awarded Best Actor in a Supporting Role

Best Actress in a Supporting Role

Speculated to be LGBTQ
The following list is composed of actress who have been claimed to be LGBT by others. They have been outed by a third party either alive or after their death. However, they never publicly came out.

Performances of LGBTQ Characters Nominated for or Awarded Best Actress in a Supporting Role

Best Animated Feature

Best Cinematography

Best Costume Design

Best Director

Speculated to be LGBTQ
The following list is composed of directors who have been claimed to be LGBT by others. They have been outed by a third party either alive or after their death. However, they never publicly came out.

Best Documentary Feature

Best Documentary Short Subject

Best Film Editing

Best Makeup & Hairstyling

Best Music, Original Score

Best Music, Original Song Score or Adaptation

Best Music, Original Song

Best Picture

Best Picture winners and nominees with LGBTQ themes

Speculated to be LGBTQ
The following list is composed of producers who have been claimed to be LGBT by others. They have been outed by a third party either alive or after their death. However, they never publicly came out.

Best Production Design

Best Short Film (Animated)

Best Short Film (Live Action)

Best Sound Mixing

Best Writing (Adapted Screenplay)

Best Writing (Original Screenplay)

Speculated to be LGBTQ
The following list is composed of writers who have been claimed to be LGBT by others. They have been outed by a third party either alive or after their death. However, they never publicly came out.

Best Writing (Original Story)

Governors Awards
The Governors Awards are an annual ceremony hosted by the Academy of Motion Picture Arts and Sciences dedicated to honor actors and filmmakers with lifetime achievement awards. Three awards are given: the Academy Honorary Award, the Jean Hersholt Humanitarian Award, and the Irving G. Thalberg Memorial Award. Unlike the Academy Awards, the nominations and voting for these awards are restricted to members of the Board of Governors of AMPAS.

The Academy Honorary Award honors exceptional career achievements, contributions to the motion picture industry, and service to the Academy.The Academy Honorary Award is often awarded in preference to those with noted achievements in motion pictures who have nevertheless never won an Academy Award. Thus, many of its recipients are Classic Hollywood stars, such as Lillian Gish, Barbara Stanwyck, Kirk Douglas, and Lauren Bacall.
 
Among its Honorary Awards for acting, the Academy also presents deserving young actors with the Special Juvenile Academy Award. (Most of those are not listed here; some of the early "Special Awards" that later became known in that acting category as the "Special Juvenile Academy Award" are listed with "Special Award" added parenthetically.)

The Jean Hersholt Humanitarian Award honors an individual's outstanding contributions to humanitarian causes.

The Irving G. Thalberg Memorial Award honors creative producers, whose bodies of work reflect a consistently high quality of motion picture production.

Notes

References

Citations

Bibliography

 

LGBTQ
Academy Awards
Academy Awards